Ed Walker may refer to:

 Ed Walker (radio personality) (1932–2015), American radio personality
 Ed Walker (American football), American football player and coach of football and basketball
 Ed Walker (American football official), NFL official
 Ed Walker (American veteran) (1917–2011), American veteran of World War II, businessman, publisher and writer
 Ed Walker (baseball) (1874–1947), Major League Baseball pitcher

See also 
 Edward Walker (disambiguation)
 Ed Waller